Max Price is a former vice-chancellor and principal of the University of Cape Town (UCT) in South Africa. He succeeded Njabulo Ndebele and held this position for 10 years from 19 August 2008 until 30 June 2018.

Education and career
A qualified medical doctor, Price previously served as Dean of the Faculty of Health Sciences at the University of the Witwatersrand.

He has an MBBCh degree from the University of the Witwatersrand (1979); a BA (Hons) PPE (Oxford University 1983); an M.Sc in Community Health from the London School of Hygiene and Tropical Medicine; and a Diploma in Occupational Health from Wits University.

Student years and activism 
During Price's time as a student, he served as President of the Student Representative Council at Wits University, during South Africa's student protest years. He was also an executive member of NUSAS.

While organising the first anniversary commemorations of the Soweto Uprising, Price was arrested and detained in solitary confinement for 12 days at John Vorster Square.

Price was awarded a Rhodes Scholarship to Oxford University from 1981 to 1983.

Post-apartheid policy-making
In 1988, Price joined the newly established Centre for Health Policy in South Africa, which had the primary focus of envisioning post-apartheid health policy. Then, in 1992, Price served as Chairperson of the first Steering Committee of the National Progressive Primary Health Care Network (NPPHCN) / South African Health and Social Services Organisation (SAHSSO) Policy Conference.

Price has a Google Scholar h-index of 16, including journal articles, technical papers, and media contributions on health systems research, the political economy of health, health economics and financing, privatisation and medical aids, medical education, etc.

In 1995, Price was Dean of the Faculty of Health Sciences of Wits University from 1996 to 2006. In 1997, the Faculty made a submission to the Truth and Reconciliation Commission (TRC) and held an internal reconciliation process, inviting black alumni to express how they had experienced training as doctors under apartheid.

As Dean, Price led a series of initiatives, including the Internal Reconciliation Commission; a graduate entry medical programme; academic programmes in rural health, bio-ethics, sports medicine, emergency medicine, and bio-medical sciences; and the founding of the country's first university-owned private teaching hospital, The Wits Donald Gordon Medical Centre, and the first university research company, Wits Health Consortium.

In 2004, Price was elected an Honorary Fellow Ad Eundum of the Colleges of Medicine of South Africa in Public Health Medicine. From 2006 to 2008, Price served on the board of directors of the Aurum Institute for Health Research, a non-profit AIDS/Tuberculosis research organisation.

Vice-Chancellor of UCT
Price was installed as vice-chancellor of UCT on 19 August 2008. During his decade-long tenure, UCT saw several new institutes and initiatives, including the Hasso Plattner School of Design Thinking, the Nelson Mandela School of Public Governance, and the Global Citizen Initiative. Price also oversaw the increasing of the institution's research output and impact, in the form of an 85% increase in the number of peer-reviewed publications; the doubling of National Research Foundation-rated researchers; growth in international student numbers and research collaborations; a 43% increase in masters and doctoral students; and the trebling of research income.

During the period of Price's stewardship, UCT was the first university on the African continent to begin to offer massive open online courses or MOOCs. It was consistently ranked in the world's top 200 universities according to the Times Higher Education rankings and as Africa's top university in almost all rankings.

Price's own initiatives, referred to as Vice-Chancellor Strategic Initiatives (and spanning university-wide cross-disciplinary research initiatives to address critical national challenges), included the African Climate and Development Initiative, the Safety and Violence Initiative, the Poverty and Inequality Initiative, and the Schools Improvement Initiative.

In 2015 Price was co-founder and first Chair  of the African Research Universities Alliance, created to strengthen links between research universities in Africa. He was also a Member of the Global Universities Leaders’ Forum of the World Economic Forum and a Member of the Board of Directors of the Community Organisation Resources Centre (CORC).

Fees Must Fall movement

From 2015 to 2017, the University of Cape Town experienced a series of student and worker protests that were part of a larger national protest movement. The key issues were the demand for free education (#FeesMustFall); decolonisation and transformation (#RhodesMustFall); and union demands for outsourced workers to be re-insourced.

As vice-chancellor, Price's leadership of the university's approach to the protests generated  both criticism and praise from many sides. Some said that Price showed a  “gross lack of leadership “. Others argued that the use of private security and police to control protests was unnecessary. Price’s decisions at that time and their deleterious consequences for the status and functioning of UCT as an institution have been detailed in David Benetar’s book, “The Fall of the University of Cape Town: Africa's Leading University in Decline”.

At the national level, the #FeesMustFall movement achieved a commitment from government to provide grants to fully fund university education for students from lower income households (below R350,000 a year). At UCT, the movement led to the removal of the statue of Cecil John Rhodes from its position in the centre of the campus. Another success was the insourcing of 1300 workers (including cleaners, drivers, security, residence kitchen staff) who had previously been outsourced.

Recent Memberships

Price served as Chair of the Worldwide Universities Network (WUN) Partnership Board from 2014 to 2016, and as Vice-Chair during 2013-2014 and 2016-2017.

From 2011 to 2018, Price served as a Member of the Council (Governing Body) of the University of Ghana, Legon. From 2014 to 2018, he was a Member of the Global Council of Hanban, the Headquarters of the Confucius Institutes, serving as one of ten university presidents who constitute its external members.

Price currently serves on a panel of senior external experts selected for the Expert Commission of Fondation Botnar, which provides funding opportunities for research and innovation to benefit children and young people.

References

Academic staff of the University of Cape Town
Living people
University of the Witwatersrand alumni
South African Rhodes Scholars
Alumni of the London School of Hygiene & Tropical Medicine
Academic staff of the University of the Witwatersrand
Alumni of Magdalen College, Oxford
Year of birth missing (living people)
Vice-Chancellors of the University of Cape Town